St. John's Episcopal Church is located in Sparta, Wisconsin. It was added to the National Register of Historic Places in 1983 for its architectural significance. The church is part of the Episcopal Diocese of Eau Claire.

References

Churches on the National Register of Historic Places in Wisconsin
Episcopal churches in Wisconsin
Churches completed in 1863
Churches in Monroe County, Wisconsin
19th-century Episcopal church buildings
National Register of Historic Places in Monroe County, Wisconsin